Rubén Derfler (born 2 June 1976) is an Argentine former racing driver. He has competed in such series as the Japanese Touring Car Championship, Formula Nippon and TC2000 Championship. He won the 1997 Formula Toyota season and was runner-up of Formula Renault Argentina in 1995. In 2000 Derfler returned to Argentina to race in TC2000 before retire from motorsport.

Racing record

Career summary

Complete JTCC results 
(key) (Races in bold indicate pole position) (Races in italics indicate fastest lap)

Complete Formula Nippon results 
(key) (Races in bold indicate pole position) (Races in italics indicate fastest lap)

Complete JGTC results 
(key) (Races in bold indicate pole position) (Races in italics indicate fastest lap)

References

External links 
 

1976 births
Living people
Sportspeople from Entre Ríos Province
Argentine racing drivers
Formula Renault Argentina drivers
Formula 3 Sudamericana drivers
Japanese Touring Car Championship drivers
Formula Nippon drivers
TC 2000 Championship drivers
Kondō Racing drivers
Dandelion Racing drivers